The Kelowna Heat were a minor league baseball team located in Kelowna, British Columbia. The team played in the short-lived Canadian Baseball League and was not affiliated with any Major League Baseball team.

Defunct minor league baseball teams
Defunct baseball teams in Canada
Baseball teams disestablished in 2003
Baseball teams in British Columbia
Sport in Kelowna
Defunct independent baseball league teams
2003 establishments in British Columbia
2003 disestablishments in British Columbia
Baseball teams established in 2003